Ambra Medda (born 1982) is a London based design consultant who is the co-founder and director of Design Miami. She also co-founded the design website L’ArcoBaleno and headed a department at Christie's auction house.

Career
In 2005, Medda co-founded Design Miami, along with real estate developer Craig Robins, and was also the fair's director until 2010.  The annual event, which is considered to be "one of the most influential design fairs in the world", first began as a salon for Italian design. A sister show, called Design Miami Basel, was launched in Switzerland and is also held yearly.  As director, Medda created partnerships with notable galleries, collectors and companies, bringing together the international design community. After stepping down, she continued to sit on committees and acted as a creative consultant for the fair.

In 2013, Medda co-founded an e-commerce design website named L’ArcoBaleno, meaning "rainbow" in Italian. The site included collaborations with David Adjaye, Tom Dixon and Reed Krakoff.
In 2015, Medda became Global Creative Director of the "20/21 Design" department at Christie's. Her department focused on auctioning design objects, such as furniture and lighting, from the 20th and 21st century. In 2016, she founded Ambra Medda Office (AMO), a design consultancy firm where she advises clients like Airbnb and Louis Vuitton. Medda is also involved with the Design Museum in London as a trustee and committee member.

Medda's other projects include curating an exhibit for Madrid artist José María Cano in 2004. In 2008, she authored the book "Destination: Limited-Edition Design", which examined the top exhibition places in the world. 
In 2009, she collaborated with Fendi, bringing together designers for the project Craft Punk. She also helped design a 2014 collection of handbags for the Roger Vivier brand and was featured in its ad campaign. In 2018, Medda organized visits to the Villa Borsani, designed by Osvaldo Borsani, for the Milan Furniture Fair in Italy.

Medda has been described as being an "icon of the style" by the French magazine Madame Figaro. She has stated that "putting the historic and the contemporary together brings out the best in both".   By mixing the old and new, her design aesthetic has been interpreted as creating tension with unexpected combinations. Medda also came up with the phrase "designers are the new rock stars".

Background
Medda was born in Greece, to a Sardinian mother and Austrian father, and later lived in London and Milan. 
Growing up she attended auctions with her mother, who was a design dealer and co-founder of the Themes and Variations gallery in London.
She studied "Chinese Language and Culture", as well as "Asian Art", at London University Medda was previously married to American singer Damian Kulash. She currently lives in London with Edward Barber and they have two children.

References

External links
http://www.crane.tv/ambra-medda

1981 births
British designers
Italian designers
American designers
British people of Italian descent
British people of Austrian descent
Living people